The Broadlands Dam (also known as the Broadlands Hydropower Project by the developers) is a  run-of-the-river hydroelectric complex  currently under construction in Kitulgala, Sri Lanka. The project is expected to be completed in 2020, and will consist of two dams, and a power station further downstream.

Approximately  project funding was met via credit arrangements made with the Chinese government, with the rest borne via a loan from the local Hatton National Bank. The construction contract of the project was granted to the China National Electric Equipment Corporation (CNEEC).

Dams and reservoirs 

See also 
 Electricity in Sri Lanka
 List of dams and reservoirs in Sri Lanka
 List of power stations in Sri Lanka

References 

Hydroelectric power stations in Sri Lanka
Dams in Sri Lanka
Run-of-the-river power stations
Dams under construction
Buildings and structures in Nuwara Eliya District
Gravity dams